The 103rd Division()(2nd Formation) was activated on February 26, 1951 from 5th Military Sub-district and elements from the former 103rd Division. The division was composed of:
307th Infantry Regiment (former 5th Security Regiment of Zhejiang Military District);
308th Infantry Regiment (expanded from 2nd Battalion, 309th Infantry Regiment of former 103rd Division);
309th Infantry Regiment (1st and 3rd Battalion, Security Regiment of Zhejiang Military Region).

The division was acting as Wenzhou Military Sub-district.

In June 1952 the division was disbanded along with its 308th Infantry Regiment. Its 307th Infantry Regiment was transferred to Wenzhou Military Sub-district, while 309th Infantry Regiment was transferred to Taizhou Military Sub-district's control.

References

建国后中国人民解放军步兵师的发展, http://club.xilu.com/zgjsyj/msgview-819697-74513.html

103
Military units and formations disestablished in 1952
Military units and formations established in 1951
1951 establishments in China